Bang the Drum is an Australian pop rock band formed in Sydney. Two of their singles reached the top 50 on the Australian Singles chart.

Background
Formed in 1980 Tasmanian rock band Shifters consisted of Steve Driver (vocals), Jim Reece (guitar, vocals), Geoff Robson (bass, vocals) and Freddy Spiteri (drummer). The band split their time between touring heavily in Tasmania and playing in Sydney before breaking up in 1985. The band put out two singles, "Holdin' Out"/"Public Man" and "Sunday Night Blues"/"Desperate Life", in the early 80s.

Bang the Drum
Driver, Reece and Robson stayed in Sydney and formed Bang the Drum. Completing the band was J. J. Harris (ex Divinyls) and Jeremy Cole. The band released one selftitled album in 1990 and toured nationally in support of Fleetwood Mac.

Members
Steve Driver (vocals)
Jim Reece (guitar, vocals)
Geoff Robson (bass, vocals)
Jeremy Cole (keyboards)
J. J. Harris (drums)

Discography

Albums

Singles

References 

Australian musical groups
Australian rock music groups
Tasmanian musical groups
Living people
Year of birth missing (living people)